"Phineas and Ferb: Summer Belongs to You!" is the 54th broadcast episode of the second season and the 101st broadcast episode overall of the animated television series Phineas and Ferb. It aired on Disney XD on August 2, 2010. It is the first one-hour special, and is longer than "Phineas and Ferb Christmas Vacation", which is 45 minutes long. This episode was first seen at San Diego Comic-Con on July 25, 2010.

Plot
Phineas feels bored after he and Ferb have accomplished much throughout the summer. For a taste of adventure, the duo and their friends decide to travel around the world at the same speed as the Earth's rotation, so as to make a complete 24-hour day, in an effort to create the "biggest, longest, funnest summer day of all time".

Meanwhile, Dr. Doofenshmirtz takes a trip to Tokyo with Vanessa. At first, Vanessa is amazed, but is later distraught to find out that her father has brought in a captured Major Monogram and has been making a plan to ruin the International Good Guy Convention with a giant water balloon and frame Monogram for it. She then accuses her father of always putting his work before her relationship with him, and decides to leave for Paris on her own. Around the same time, Perry the Platypus catches wind of Monogram's whereabouts after Carl warns him of a suspicious note sent to the O.W.C.A. (presumably sent by Doofenshmirtz).

In Tokyo, the gang meets with Stacy's cousins while getting vegetable oil used as fuel. While there, Vanessa joins with the group after being accidentally knocked off the Tokyo Tower by the giant balloon thanks to the intervention of Perry, who arrives at the tower as Agent P. Fearing for Vanessa's safety, Doof decides to abandon his plan and opts to rescue her, and Perry and Major Monogram are compelled to help him, so they travel aboard Agent P's platypus-shaped hovercar.

The group, along with Vanessa, then crashes on the Indian portion of the Himalayas, and their plane loses its wings. Phineas and the other kids go see Baljeet's grand-uncle Sabu, who runs a rubber band/rubber ball factory there. He sings "Rubber Bands" as he shows the kids around the factory. This gives them an idea: namely, to attach a bouncy rubber ball to the bottom of the plane so they could travel their way to Paris and back home. As they travel around the world in their newly-fixed way of transport, the song "Bouncin' Around The World" is heard.

In Paris, known to Isabella as "the city of love", Candace sees Jeremy with a bunch of boys and girls and leaves. Isabella is upset as Phineas is completely oblivious to her feelings for him, since what he cares about the most is getting the craft refixed. On the top of the Eiffel Tower, Ferb consults with a depressed Vanessa about her relationship with her father, telling her to try and meet him halfway in their relationship by socializing more. Ferb walks away for a moment; then Doofenshmirtz, Perry, and Major Monogram come to rescue her. Vanessa is initially upset at her father bringing 'work' again, but Doof complains of all the trouble and the help he needed from Perry and Monogram to travel halfway around the world to rescue Vanessa for her sake.

The group later leaves Paris, but the boat disintegrates leaving only the seats. They crash on a deserted island, which possesses only two palm trees and a big fat ox. Meanwhile, in Paris, Major Monogram and Perry arrest Doof, along with Vanessa, who stops them and goes away with her father in Perry's hovercraft. This leaves the platypus upset as he is left behind by Monogram, who has to "take in a review". Back on the isle, Phineas, after a desperate attempt to find a way off the island, finally gives up and sits down to watch the sunset with Isabella like she wants, but she encourages him and he gets the idea to use Ferb's giant map as a massive paper airplane. The group launch and ride the paper airplane back to Danville, where there is a huge ditch due to road construction, with their neighborhood at the other side. With one minute left, Buford gives everyone back the bikes whom he stole from. He never stole Candace's bike, so Phineas forces her to ride on a green tricycle and the group is able to jump the pit using a makeshift ramp and arrive home with a second to spare. The parents arrive home too, but for once Candace says nothing as she enjoyed herself. As everyone sings "Summer Belongs to You", Jeremy comes home early and kisses Candace, calling her his girlfriend to her excitement. After the celebration, Phineas wonders where Perry might be, and the episode ends with an abandoned Perry at a restaurant in Paris.

Production
According to co-director Robert F. Hughes, the special was initially conceived as a television movie, but due to story issues, it was reduced to an hour-long special. The proposed film eventually became Across the 2nd Dimension.

Cultural references
During the song, "City of Love", Phineas can briefly be seen standing in front of the famous French Cabaret, Moulin Rouge while holding a pinwheel, most likely envisioning the use of the windmill on top as a propeller. This episode also pays homage to the popular Swedish/Japanese dance song "Caramelldansen" in which Stacy's relatives encourage Phineas and Ferb to participate in a dance and tune similar to the smash hit. Also in one part of the song, Isabella is seen waving a leek in her hand, similarly to Loituma Girl in the popular video known as "Leekspin" on YouTube. Phineas is also seen digging up a yellow sponge and a pink starfish in the episode, as a reference to SpongeBob SquarePants.

Reception
When the episode premiered on Disney Channel on August 6, 2010, 3.862 million viewers watched it with 22% of kids 2–11, 13% of teens, 5% of households, and 3% of adults 18–49, also being the #1 program on that night and it was 25th for the week in viewership. When the episode premiered on Disney XD, the episode ranked in the channel’s top 3 telecasts of the year in viewers with 1.32 million, and Boys 6–11 with 365,000, with a 2.9 rating. The hour telecast on August 2, 2010 is currently the Emmy-winning animated series’ No. 2 telecast of all time on Disney XD in Total Viewers, in kids 6–14 with 677,000 and a 1.9 rating, Boys 6–14 with 435,000 and a 2.3 rating,  and kids 6–11 with 542,000 and a 2.2 rating, Boys 6–11 and Boys 9–14 235,000 with a 1.9 rating, behind only December 2009’s “Phineas and Ferb Christmas Vacation.” 
Reviews are generally favorable with a 4/5 Rating of Common Sense Media, 8.7/10 from IMDb and the like.

References

External links

Official Phineas and Ferb website

2010 American television episodes
2010 television specials
Phineas and Ferb episodes
Rough Draft Studios films
Television specials by Disney Television Animation